Muhammad Ali and Henry Cooper fought two boxing matches with each other in London. Their first match took place on 18 June 1963 (before Ali had changed his name from Cassius Clay) and the second on 21 May 1966. Ali won both matches. The first fight was stopped by the referee in the fifth round, and the second in the sixth round. Both fights were stopped after Cooper started bleeding excessively from a cut to the left eye. The first Ali-Cooper bout is remembered for being one of the four fights in which Ali was officially knocked down in the ring by his boxing opponent, as well as leading to the mandate that ringside handlers always have an extra pair of boxing gloves available.

Ali (as Cassius Clay) vs Cooper I

Background
After a close victory over Doug Jones, Ali's management decided to match him with Henry Cooper in London. Prior to the fight, Ali called Cooper "a tramp, a bum, and a cripple not worth training for." According to Ali, the  Cooper fight was only a hiatus before "I demolish that ugly bear Liston." Responding to Ali, Cooper said in an interview: "Let him carry on. I'm on the gate, he's selling tickets and earning me good money."

The Fight
35,000 spectators witnessed the first Ali-Cooper fight in the first open-air fight at Wembley Stadium in 28 years. Ali weighed 207 pounds at this time; Cooper was about 20 pounds lighter. Ali also had a -inch reach advantage over Cooper.

Round 1
In the first round, Cooper surprised Ali by utilizing offensive tactics, advancing on Ali and firing jabs and double jabs. Many of Cooper's stronger punch, the left hook, narrowly missed their mark due to Ali's ability to sway away from an incoming punch. Unexpectedly Ali retired to his corner at the end of the round with a slight trickle of blood flowing from his right nostril.

Round 2
In the second round, Cooper continued with his aggressive tactics, but Ali's left jab now started connecting regularly with Cooper's face and a slight cut opened above Cooper's eyes.

Round 3
In the third round, Ali connected with a left hook to Cooper's head, and followed this up with a right jab that opened a deep gash above Cooper's left eyebrow.

Round 4
In the fourth round, with blood tricking down his face, Cooper continued with his aggressive tactics and started pursuing Ali who now started "fooling around", moving and throwing only intermittent punches at Cooper. Near the end of the round, Cooper threw three successive jabs as Ali stood against the ropes. Ali retreated further against the ropes when Cooper unleashed a left hook which struck Ali squarely on his jaw, lifting Ali on impact. Two things happened simultaneously at this stage which saved Ali from a possible knockout. First, the round came to an end. Second, the ropes had cushioned Ali's fall. As Cooper later recalled:

Round 4 - Round 5 interval
Angelo Dundee had to help Ali to his corner at the end of Round 4. Ali was clearly shaken up by the knockdown and was disoriented for a few seconds, attempting at one point to rise from his stool. Dundee appears to pop an ampule of smelling salts under Ali's nose (which would have been a disqualifying offense if he had been caught), although the film is inconclusive. Dundee then waved to referee Tommy Little and showed Little Ali's right glove which had apparently split down a seam revealing horsehair stuffing which could have injured Cooper's eyes. Officials were requested to obtain a new pair of gloves for Ali, and popular myth has it that the resulting confusion led to the interval between round 4 and round 5 to be extended by 20 seconds which gave Ali extra time to recover. In fact, there was no confusion; the referee refused to suspend the fight, and the fifth round was delayed by perhaps three seconds.

Round 5
In the fifth round, Ali adopted aggressive tactics himself, throwing a flurry of quick punches at Cooper which resulted in photographers near the ring splashed with Cooper's blood. Two minutes and fifteen seconds into the fifth round, the fight was stopped and Ali declared the winner.

After the fight
Immediately after the fight, Ali retracted the abuses he had directed at Cooper before the fight and declared: "Cooper's not a bum any more. I underestimated him. He's the toughest fighter I ever met and the first to really drop me. He's a real fighter."
Cooper's left hook which had dropped Ali made him a celebrity after the fight. In Facing Ali, Stephen Brunt writes:
According to Cooper:

Ali vs Cooper II
The second Ali-Cooper fight has been described as being similar to the most one-sided moments of the first without the drama of Ali's knockdown. Ali stayed away from Cooper for the first three rounds as Cooper continued to stalk him. In the next two rounds, Ali allowed Cooper to come closer; but then in the sixth round the fight was again stopped because of a cut over Cooper's eye which started bleeding profusely. Reflecting on the fight Cooper observed:

Viewership and revenue
The bout was fought at Arsenal Stadium, where it drew a live audience of 46,000 spectators. The fight held the record for the largest live audience at a British boxing event, up until Joe Calzaghe vs. Mikkel Kessler drew 55,000 spectators in 2007.

On pay-per-view closed-circuit television, the fight drew 40,000 buys in England, where it was shown in 16 theaters, grossing $1.5million ($ with inflation). The fight was telecast at Odeon Cinemas. On pay-per-view home television, the fight drew 40,000 buys, as the first fight on Britain's experimental Pay TV service, at a price of £4, grossing £ ($), equivalent to £ ($) with inflation.

The fight was later aired on BBC, where it was watched by 21million viewers in the United Kingdom. In the United States, the fight was broadcast live to 20million viewers via satellite.

References

Cooper
1963 in boxing
1966 in boxing
June 1963 sports events
May 1966 sports events